İnegöl (known as , Angelokomis in the Byzantine period) is a city (center of the İnegöl district) in the Bursa Province of Turkey. It has a population of 340,000 (2011 figures). İnegöl is one of the centers of the Turkish furniture industry, and is also known for its meatball (İnegöl köftesi) which has its origins in ćevapi brought to the region by Bosnian immigrants (Bosniaks) during the Balkan Wars.

Although considerably quieter than neighbouring Bursa and Eskişehir, İnegöl retains sufficient attractions to make it interesting to tourists on a one- or two-day stopover, as well as possessing sufficiently unspoilt nearby natural attractions to keep one occupied for longer stays. 
Notable tourist attractions are the İnegöl Kent Müzesi and (directly next to it) the İshakpaşa Historical Mosque. Nearby to İnegöl is the health resort of Oylat (also known as the Oylat Hotspring), adjacent to the Oylat Cave. İnegöl is also conveniently located near to Uludağ, a popular skiing resort during the winter months.

History
From 1867 until 1922, İnegöl was part of Hüdavendigâr vilayet.

Furniture 
İnegöl is a city surrounded rich with natural resources, especially forests, therefore wood processing businesses were always a big part of the city's economy. The first official record of wood processing business was recorded back in 1523 within Hüdavendigar cadastral record book, some of the villages were producing oars for the galleys of the Ottoman Empire.

The furniture sector of İnegöl accounts for 88.5 percent of all the industrial companies. Forty two percent of İnegöl's exports were furniture exports in 2019 ($574.559.944,38). The city is number three in furniture exports of Turkey when ranked by total volume after İstanbul and Kayseri.

There are also 2 biggest furniture shopping malls in Turkey in İnegöl.

Gallery

Notable people
Notable residents include Mustafa Ülgen, an orthodontist. A section of the İnegöl Kent Müzesi (museum) is dedicated to him.

Twin cities 
  Novi Pazar, Serbia
  Donji Vakuf, Bosnia and Herzegovina
  Dunaújváros, Hungary
  Mitrovica, Kosovo
  Takhtamukaysky District, Russia

References

Cities in Turkey
Populated places in Bursa Province
Districts of Bursa Province